The George is a grade II listed public house on the corner of Mortimer Street and Great Portland Street in the City of Westminster, London.

According to Historic England, it has an Italianate façade from the 1860s and a more ornate frontage than typical of a pub of its age. The interior is also notable for its surviving ornate original features which include glasswork, panelling, and painted tiles depicting riders and dogs.

On November 25, 2021, The George was reopened by JKS Restaurants in partnership with Dominic Jacobs and James Knappett after four years of closure and an extensive restoration.

References

External links 

Grade II listed pubs in London
Grade II listed pubs in the City of Westminster
Fitzrovia
Italianate architecture in England
Buildings and structures completed in 1860